Moisei Solomonovich Uritsky (– 30 August 1918) was a Bolshevik revolutionary leader in Russia. After the October Revolution, he was Chief of Cheka of the Petrograd Soviet. Uritsky was assassinated by Leonid Kannegisser, a military cadet, who was executed shortly afterwards.

Family

Uritsky was born in the city of Cherkasy, Kiev Governorate, to a Jewish Litvak family. His father, a merchant, died when Moisei was little and his mother raised her son by herself. He attended the Bila Tserkva Gymnasium, supporting himself through teaching and became an active social democrat.

Early political career

Moisei studied law at the St. Vladimir Imperial University of Kiev. During his studies he joined the Russian Social Democratic Labour Party and organized an underground network for importing and distributing political literature. In 1897 he was arrested and exiled for running an illegal mimeograph press. Becoming involved in the revolutionary movement, he participated in the revolutionary Jewish Bund. In 1903, he became a Menshevik. His activities in Petersburg during the 1905 Revolution earned him a second term of exile. Along with Alexander Parvus he was active in dispatching revolutionary agents to infiltrate the Tsarist security apparatus.

Russian Revolution

In 1914, he emigrated to France and contributed to the Party newspaper Our Word. Back in Russia in 1917 Uritsky became a member of the Mezhraiontsy group. A few months before the October Revolution of 1917, he joined the Bolsheviks and was elected to their Central Committee in July 1917. Uritsky played a leading part in the Bolsheviks' armed take-over in October and later was made head of the Petrograd Cheka. In this position Uritsky coordinated the pursuit and prosecution of members of the nobility, military officers and ranking Russian Orthodox Church clerics who opposed the Bolsheviks.

Because Uritsky was against the Treaty of Brest-Litovsk, he resigned his post in 1918, like Bukharin, Bubnov, Piatakov, Dzerzhinsky and Smirnov. On March 4, 1918, the Petrograd committee published the first number of the journal Kommunist, the public organ of the "left communist" opposition, as directed by Radek and Uritsky.  The Extraordinary Seventh Congress of the Bolshevik party, which was held between March 6 and 8, 1918, rejected the Theses on the Present Situation that was submitted as a resolution by the "Left Communists". The "Left Communists" Lomov and Uritsky, who were elected to the Central Committee, stated at the Congress that they would not work in the Central Committee, and did not begin work there for several months in spite of insistent demands from the Central Committee.

On May 25, 1918, with the Revolt of the Czechoslovak Legion, the Russian Civil War began and Uritsky resumed his position on the Central Committee.

Assassination

Leonid Kannegisser, a young military cadet of the Imperial Russian Army, assassinated Uritsky on August 17, 1918, outside the Petrograd Cheka headquarters in retaliation for the execution of his friend and other officers. Following this event, along with the assassination attempt on Lenin by Fanny Kaplan on August 30, the Bolsheviks began a wave of persecution known as the Red Terror. Palace Square in Petrograd was known as Uritsky Square from 1918 to 1944.

References

External links
 Moisei Uritsky. Handbook on history of the Communist Party and the Soviet Union 1898–1991.

1873 births
1918 deaths
Cheka officers
Politicians from Cherkasy
People from Kiev Governorate
University of Kyiv, Law faculty alumni
Ukrainian Jews
Ukrainian people of Lithuanian-Jewish descent
Jewish socialists
Assassinated Jews
Mensheviks
Mezhraiontsy
Old Bolsheviks
Russian Constituent Assembly members
Jewish Soviet politicians
Cheka
People of the Russian Civil War
Assassinated Soviet people
People murdered in Russia
Burials on the Field of Mars (Saint Petersburg)